The Muslim Gaddi are a Muslim community found mainly in northern India. After the independence in 1947, the Gaddi of the states of  Haryana and Delhi migrated to Pakistan and are now found in the provinces of Punjab and Sindh. In Pakistan and North India, some community members have started to refer to themselves as Ghazi  in a way to reconstruct identity.

History and origin 
There a number of theories as to the origin of the Muslim Gaddi community. In South Asia, there are two distinct groups who go by the name Gaddi. In the foothills of the Himalaya, in what are now the state of Himachal Pradesh and the union territory of Jammu and Kashmir resides a Hindu nomadic community known as the Gaddi. The Muslim Gaddi of North India is not an alpine community, but are found in the plains of North India, distributed in the states of Bihar, Uttar Pradesh and Rajasthan, and have never been nomadic. Prior to the independence in 1947, Muslim Gaddi communities were also found in Haryana. In fact, it is unclear whether there is any connection between the two groups other than the sharing of a common name.

With regards to the Muslim Gaddi, there are different theories as to their origin. The Gaddi of Bihar claim partial Arab ancestry. The Gaddi in Bihar and Jharkhand claim descent from a Sufi saint Gaddi Salahuddin Elahi, and said to have arrived in the region in the 19th century. This is shown by the fact that most Gaddi in Bihar and Jharkhand still speak Bhojpuri, the language of eastern Uttar Pradesh, and not the local Sadri language. According to some other sources, they were the earliest inhabitants of Awadh, and this region they are often also referred.

A Research Book (in Urdu) on Gaddi castes has been written by Abdul Jabbar Khan Ghazi, A Gaddi Lawyer, discussing all castes and sub castes of Gaddi present in India and Pakistan . The Origin and the initial use of Word "Gaddi" is discussed in detail in the book.

Like many other Muslim groups in North India, the Gaddi community is further divided into clans, known as biradaris, which are said to be descended from a common ancestor. Their main biradaris are the Aheer, Ahawar, Bachhar, Bais and Teli Malik. Marriages are preferred within the biradari. Their hereditary occupation was that of the production and sale of milk, but the Muslim Gaddi of Karnal and Ambala in Haryana, and the Doab region of western Uttar Pradesh were and still are mainly peasant cultivators. The Gaddi speak Urdu and well as various dialects of Hindi, such as Khari boli in western Uttar Pradesh, Haryanvi in Pakistan and Bhojpuri in Bihar.

Present circumstances 
The Gaddi are found throughout the states of Uttar Pradesh, Madhya Pradesh, Bihar, Jharkhand and Rajasthan in India and have OBC status, and the provinces of Punjab and Sindh. As consequence of the grant of OBC status, the community is eligible to obtain the benefit of a number of affirmative action programmes  of the Government of India.

In India 
In North India, the Gaddi are a community that has been associated with cattle farming. They are involved in the selling of milk, especially those settled in towns. Some owns the huge parts of Land that are earned by hard work of their ancestors. They have much in common with other pastoral communities, In addition, the western Uttar Pradesh, Rajasthan and Haryana the Gaddi have always possessed agricultural land, and are a small and medium scale cultivators. However, in eastern Uttar Pradesh, the word Gaddi is almost become synonymous with milk selling.

In Uttar Pradesh, Gaddis are found mainly in the eastern and western regions of the state, in the districts of Allahabad (on the bank of river Ganges), Aligarh, Kanpur, Unnao, Meerut, Badayun, Badohi, Sitapur, sandila, hardoi, lucknow, Lakhimpur, Bareilly, and Bahraich. However, the community is concentrated mainly in western Uttar Pradesh, in particular the districts of Meerut, Bulandshahr and Aligarh and historically in the neighbouring areas of Haryana such as Karnal and Ambala. The western Uttar Pradesh Gaddi, like other neighbouring peasant castes have benefited from the effects of the green revolution, and many have successfully begun mechanising their farming, such as buying tractors.

The Gaddi are Muslims of the Sunni sect, following various denominations such as Hanafi, Deobandi, and even local Folk Islam. They are an endogamous community, practising clan and village exogamy in Rajasthan and Uttar Pradesh (i.e. not marrying within the clan). Among other Gaddi communities, marriages are preferred within the biradari, and with a marked preference for parallel cousin and cross cousin marriages. The Gaddi tend to reside in multi clan and multi religious villages, often occupying their own quarters. In western Uttar Pradesh, the Gaddi are what is often referred to as the dominant clan, usually making between half and two thirds of the population of the village, and their villages are referred to as Gaddi villages. In Awadh, Bihar and Jharkhand the Gaddi are often one of the occupational clans, and are never numerically dominant. Each of their settlement contains an informal clan association, known as a biradari panchayat. The panchayat is headed by a chaudhary, a position that is often hereditary within a particular family. Among the duties of the panchayat is the resolving of intra community disputes and punishing those who breach community norms.
 
The Gaddi in Rajasthan are found mainly in Bundi, Bharatpur, and Sawai Madhopur districts. They speak a mixed dialect of Hindi and Urdu, as well as the Marwari dialect. According to their traditions, they acquired the name Gaddi from their ancestral occupation of cleaning the thrones (Gaddi in Urdu) of the Mughal Emperors. The community claims to be of Rajput ancestry that converted to Islam. In Rajasthan, the community consists of small and medium-sized farmers.  A small member of Gaddi are employed govt sarvis, The Gaddi of Rajasthan have their own clan council, the Gaddi Navayung Mandal, which  act as institution for social control as well as welfare for the community.  Like other Muslim communities in Rajasthan, they are strictly endogamous.

The Gaddi in Bihar and Jharkhand claim descent from a Sufi saint Gaddi Salahuddin Elahi. They are said to have emigrated from Uttar Pradesh in the 19th century, and their earliest settlement was Bihar Sharif. The Gaddi are found in Ranchi, Dhanbad, Lohardaga, Chakradharpur, Rohtas and Jamshedpur. The Gaddi are strictly endogamous, and practice both cross-cousin and parallel cousin marriages. They speak both Urdu and Bhojpuri. The Gaddi of Bihar are largely landless, relying on the selling of milk, and are a semi-urban community. A small number of the community have become businessmen and petty traders. The Gaddi have their own clan association, the Bihar Gaddi Anjuman.

In Pakistan 

The Haryana and Delhi Gaddi emigrated to Pakistan, after the independence in 1947. In the Ambala and Karnal, the Gaddi were already a community of small cultivators, and they remain so in Pakistan. According to the traditions of the Haryana Gaddi, they are a Rajput clan, that is believed to have accepted Islam during reign of Sultan Mahmood Ghazanwi, and as such the community refers to itself as Gadi Rajputs. The Gaddi are now found mainly in central and south Punjab, in the districts of  Muzaffargarh, Okara, Shaikhupura, Gujranwala and Nankana Sahib . They are particularly concentrated in the districts of Gujranwala and Shaikhupura  Lahore, District Bhakkar, District Jhang and towns of Kot Addu and Kundhya.

The Punjab Gaddi live in multi ethnic villages, but occupy their own distinct quarters. Most Gaddi remain small and medium scale farmers, although a good number also seek in employment in the armed forces and police. Like in India, most Gaddi settlements contain biradari panchayats, which act as instruments of social control, and they remain strictly endogamous, preferring to marry close kin, such as parallel cousins. The community speak Haryanvi among themselves, and Punjabi with the wider community. Most Gaddi also now speak Urdu, and are Sunni.
 
The Gaddis of Delhi and Rajasthan have settled in Sindh and are still involved with dairy farming, and are found mainly in the cities of Karachi, Hyderabad and Mirpurkhas. They speak Haryanvi among themselves and Urdu with outsiders. Many of those settled in Hyderabad and Mirpurkhas also speak Sindhi. The Gaddi have set up their own clan association, the All Pakistan Anjuman-e-Biradri Gaddi, which has set up community centres and acts a community welfare association. Besides these, in Karachi, they have a separate community registered with the name "Anjuman Rajput Gaddi" with central office in Ranchore Lane, an old city area of Karachi. This community is living in Karachi since migrating from India after independence in a closed community system having population concentration in Ranchore Lane, Burns Road, its adjoining areas and Mehmoodabad.

See also 
 Gaddi
 Gaderia

Footnotes

References
Verma, V. 1996. Gaddis of Dhauladhar: A Transhumant Tribe of the Himalayas. Indus Publishing Company, New Delhi.

Social groups of Pakistan
Punjabi tribes
Social groups of Punjab, Pakistan
Muslim communities of India
Social groups of Uttar Pradesh
Muslim communities of Uttar Pradesh
Social groups of Bihar
Social groups of Rajasthan